Anthony Bajon (born 7 April 1994) is a French actor. He is best known for his leading role in the film The Prayer (2018), which earned him critical appreciation and the Silver Bear for Best Actor.

Biography 
Anthony Bajon began his acting career at the age of 12 on the stage of theater. Since then he has performed regularly in various theaters in France.

In 2015, Bajon debuted in Léa Fehner's film Les Ogres, after which he starred in the films Rodin by Jacques Doillon, and André Téchiné's Golden Years among others.

In 2018, Anthony Bajon played the lead role of 22-year-old drug addict Thomas in Cédric Kahn's movie The Prayer. For this role, he received the Silver Bear for Best Actor at the Berlin International Film Festival, becoming the seventh French actor in history of the festival to be honored with this award.

Selected filmography
 2015: Les Ogres : Le jeune de la caravane
 2016: Irreplaceable : Le jeune homme au condylome
 2016: Les Enfants de la chance : Marcel
 2017: L'Embarras du choix : Etudiant maitre d'hotel
 2017: Maryline : Simon, le frere de Maryline
 2017: Golden Years : Le petit Vaugoubert   
 2017: Rodin : Auguste Beuret
 2018: The Prayer : Thomas
 2019: Merveilles a Montfermeil : Guillaume
 2019: Au nom de la terre : Thomas
 2019: Tu merites un amour : Charlie
 2019: Teddy : Teddy
 2021: A Radiant Girl : Igor
 2021: Les méchants : Carcéral
 2021: Another World : Lucas Lemesle
 2022: Athena - Jérôme
 2022: Le Monde de Demain - Bruno Lopes/Kool Shen

Awards
 Silver Bear for Best Actor at 2018 Berlin Film Festival for The Prayer (winner)
 César Award for Most Promising Actor at 2019 César Awards for The Prayer (nomination)
 Lumières Award for Most Promising Actor at 2019 Lumières Awards for The Prayer (nomination)

References

External links

1994 births
Living people
French male child actors
French male film actors
French male stage actors
French male television actors
Silver Bear for Best Actor winners